History Detectives is a documentary television series on PBS. It features investigations made by members of a small team of researchers to identify and/or authenticate items which may have historical significance or connections to important historical events, and to answer specific questions brought to them about these artifacts.  Common subjects are family heirlooms and historical structures. Its stated mission is "exploring the complexities of historical mysteries, searching out the facts, myths and conundrums that connect local folklore, family legends and interesting objects."

Over its first decade, the series featured a team of several "detectives": originally Wes Cowan, Elyse Luray, Gwen Wright, and Tukufu Zuberi, later joined by Eduardo Pagán.  Following a hiatus, the program returned in summer 2014 in a different format, with hosts Zuberi and Cowan joined by Kaiama Glover, as History Detectives: Special Investigations.

Though not officially cancelled, History Detectives is not planning new episodes as of September 2015.

Stations can continue to run the original History Detectives. The rights to the first 10 seasons have been cleared for 10 years, which explains why the first 5 seasons are not re-running or streaming.

Format

Episodes usually include three segments, each centering on a single "mystery" or "case". Usually a case will be handled by a single "detective" although in early episodes two would occasionally investigate a single case, and there have been cases where a "detective" has called on one of their colleagues for help, usually when the case involves a specialty of their colleague's.

Each segment begins with a brief introduction and then shows the "detective" meeting with a person who has brought the case to their attention.  The cases always revolve around a physical object which is supposedly related in some manner to American history. Usually these are family heirlooms of some type, although occasionally they are public objects or landmarks or items owned by private archives or museums. The person presenting them with the case then shows the investigator the item in question and relates their understanding of how this item is connected to American history. Often this involves some element of folk history which has been handed down as family or local lore. The investigator will then ask them what they want to find out about the item and the owner will generally give them two or three central questions. Often the questions will revolve around whether the item was owned by a particular famous personage or whether it was used in a particular historic event. Sometimes the investigator will be asked to track down an obscure creator of a certain item. The investigator will then promise to look into the questions and, if the item in question is portable, will ask to take it with them.

The rest of the segment involves an investigation of the item's history, focusing particularly on the questions asked by the person who presented them with the case.  If the provenance of the item is in doubt they will often begin by establishing whether or not the item came from the period in question.  This will often involve a series of physical tests as well as consultation with experts on appraisal.  When tracking down specific people the investigators will engage in archival research using such resources as biographies, histories, newspapers, and city directories.  In attempting to establish the history of the item, the investigators will meet with experts, particularly historians, to gain historical context.  When needed other experts such as park rangers, appraisers, and experts in relevant skills will be consulted.  Often, experts will be asked to provide their opinion on the plausibility of a story which is attached to the item, or to explain why a specific historical event happened in a particular way.

When dealing with more recent history, the investigators will often try and contact people involved in certain events both in order to gain context and to verify the truth of an item's folk history.  Generally the last interview will be abruptly ended before the audience can learn the final revelation.  The investigator then returns to the person who brought them the case and informs them of what he has learned, including rolling clips of revealing statements from the final expert consulted.  Occasionally the end of the segment will involve a "reward" of sorts.  Sometimes this involves presenting the people who brought them the case with an item somehow related to the history of their item. Other times this will involve a meeting with a person who had produced or previously owned their item or, if that person is deceased, their relatives.  For example, in a case where they were trying to track down the artist who had drawn a World War II POW's picture they found that the artist was deceased but they "reunited" the POW with the artist's son.

Between segments are interstitial material involving stock footage and one of the investigators giving narration that relates to the general topic which had been covered in the preceding segment. For example, a segment which dealt with desegregation in Major League Baseball, the interstitial material discussed the World War II service of several black ballplayers.

The show only airs original episodes in the summer months. Reruns air in some areas of the country the rest of the year as well as on PBS World. The sixth season in 2008 brought some changes including a new opening sequence. In the seventh season in 2009, Eduardo Pagan, a noted historian and author joined the detectives. In the ninth season in 2011, marked a change from regularly airing on Mondays to Tuesdays. The tenth season premiered on July 17, 2012 with another new opening sequence. Also, the 10th-season premiere episode was their 100th of the series.

In 2014, the show changed its name to "History Detectives: Special Investigations" and debuted a new format. Joining Zuberi and Cowan was historian Kaiama Glover. In contrast to previous seasons, each episode of "History Detectives: Special Investigations" focuses on a single subject such as the Austin "Servant Girl Annihilator", the Sultana disaster, or the death of band leader Glenn Miller. The three hosts investigate different aspects of the incident and then reunite for a final report.

Production
Elvis Costello's "Watching the Detectives" was the show's theme song for its first decade. The drum sequences also served as segues between each segment of an episode. In 2014, the show changed to an original composition for its theme music.

During an online chat with The Washington Post in 2005, Elyse Luray stated that each segment took approximately six weeks to complete. While on the show it appears that each filmed segment is happening spontaneously, the research is generally completed prior to filming, and the investigator will then later return to certain research points for filming so the investigation will appear as a coherent story for the viewer.

Home Video

VHS tape - PBS sporadically released the first 4 seasons on VHS tape, dubbed as PBS member 'Thank You Gifts'.

DVD-R - In August 2007 PBS announced in season 5 that "you could buy this episode on DVD for $24.99 by calling PBS". They also offered the complete series for $249.90. https://web.archive.org/web/20070810150312/http://www.shoppbs.org/family/index.jsp?categoryId=1789689&clickid=lftnav_sbi_txt
This single episode offer of made-to-order DVD-Rs lasted through season 8.  Previous seasons were not re-issued on DVD-R. Since these DVD-Rs were made-to-order there is no guarantee that every episode was ordered and exists on DVD-R.  The Internet Web Archive confirms these were sold on PBS.org for 6 or more years: https://web.archive.org/web/20071011071619/http://www.shoppbs.org/family/index.jsp?categoryId=2780128&cp=1378003. And by 2013 other seasons were offered on-line: https://web.archive.org/web/20130126153726/http://www.shoppbs.org/family/index.jsp?cp=1378003&categoryId=2780128&pg=1
By September 2015 shoppbs.org cut the price drastically to $9.95.and in 2016 only 501,502,504,505, and 801 were still available, price raised to $17.99, along with the seasons 9, 10, Special Investigations Sets. By 2018 the individual episodes were gone.

DVD manufactured discs - With season 9 PBS Home Video decided to manufacture pressed DVDs as season sets. This guarantees that all episodes for seasons 9, 10 and Special Investigations were put on DVD.  Previous seasons were not re-issued on pressed DVD season sets.  Starting in 2011 they started to go out of print, season 9 in June, season 10 in August, and the Special Investigations are soon to be unavailable.

The usual buyer of these home video releases are Public Libraries , so it is common to find retired library copies for sale.

Video Streaming - Select episodes from seasons 5 - 11 are available for video streaming from PBS.org

Full 55 minute Broadcast Episodes and Original Air Dates.
As of 2011, seasons 1 through 6 have been removed from re-run broadcasts (unless noted)

 101	Jul/14/03		Old Fire Station  /  Pebble in the Sand  /  'Pop' Lloyd Baseball Stadium
 102	Jul/15/03		Bonnie & Clyde Bullets  /  Movie Palace  /  Sears Home
 103	Jul/16/03		Jigsaw Puzzle  /  Whaling Ship  /  Witch's House
 104	Jul/17/03		Cannon House  /  General Washington Portrait  /  Independence Trumpet
 105	Jul/21/03		General Lee Farewell/Napoleons Sword/Natchez House
 106	Jul/28/03		Chinese Poems  /  Japanese House  /  John Browns Letters
 107	Aug/04/03		Mexican Currency  /  Pirate Spyglass  /  Railroad Station
 108	Aug/25/03		Boarding House Flag  /  Home of Lincoln Assassination Plot  /  Ventriloquist's Dummy
 109	Sep/01/03		Dutch Colonial Home  /  Mark Twain's Watch  /  Revolutionary War Poem
 110	Sep/09/03		Flint-Lock Rifle  /  Lafayette China  /  Prison Plaque
 201	Jun/21/04		Civil War Submarine  /  Red Cloud's Peace Pipe  /  Thomas Edison's House
 202	Jun/28/04		Early Monopoly  /  Internment Artwork  /  Lewis and Clark Cane
 203	Jul/05/04		Anti-Slavery Flag  /  Mail Order Brides  /  WWII Landing Craft
 204	Jul/12/04		First Movie Studio  /  Hollywood: Warner's Lighter  /  King Kong Camera
 205	Jul/19/04		Dueling Pistols  /  Little Big Horn Bayonet  /  Nesbit Portrait
 206	Aug/02/04		Preston Brooks' Riding Crop  /  Revolutionary War Cannon  /  Home of Lincoln Assassination Plot (R)
 207	Aug/16/04		(repeats) Chinese Poem  /  Ventriloquist's Dummy  /  Witch's House
 208	Aug/22/04		(repeats) Bonnie & Clyde Bullets  /  George Washington Portrait  /  Revolutionary War Poem
 209	Sep/06/04		Lost Gold Ship  /  John Hunt Morgan Saddle  /  Cesar Chavez Banner
 210	Sep/13/04		Continental Army Muster Roll  /  Pretty Boy Floyd's Gun  /  Pop Lloyd Baseball Stadium (R)
 211	Sep/20/04		Charlie Parker's Saxophone  /  Koranic School Book  /  Prison Plague (R)
 212	Sep/17/04	(Last broadcast in 2019) Body in the Basement  /  Newport U-Boat  /  Shippen Golf Club
 301	Jun/27/05		Geronimo Photograph  /  Lindbergh Engine  /  Suicide Pin
 302	Jul/11/05		Black Star Line  /  Micky Mouse  /  Texas POW Camp
 303	Jul/18/05	(Last broadcast in 2019) Arthur Szyk's Earliest Cartoons / Professor Lowe's Hot Air Balloon / Chemical Warfare Map
 304	Jul/25/05		Cherokee Bible  /  Slave Banjo  /  United Empire Loyalist
 305	Aug/01/05		(repeats) George Washington Portrait  /  Revolutionary War Cannon  /  Revolutionary War Poem
 306	Aug/15/05		Secrets of the Tape  /  Mountain Mail Bag  /  Banned Birth Control Box
 307	Aug/22/05		Doc Holliday's Watch  /  Civil War Female Soldiers  /  Japanese Internment Camp Artwork
 308	Aug/29/05	(Last broadcast in 2019)Calf Creek Arrow  /  Goering Gun  /  Thomas Edison's House (R)
 309	Sep/05/05		Coney Island Lion  /  Legacy of a Doll  /  Ballet Shoes
 310	Sep/12/12		Jim Thorpe Ticket  /  Land Grant  /  Leisurama Homes
 311	Sep/19/05		Home for Unwed Mothers  /  Long Expedition Encampment  /  Evelyn Nesbit Portrait
 401	Jun/19/06		The Chisholm Trail  /  Harry Houdini Poster  /  McKinley Casket
 402	Jun/26/06		Confederate Eyeglass  /  Howard Hughes' Invention  /  Wartime Baseball
 403	Jul/05/06		Coca-Cola Trade Card  /  Lawrence Strike  /  Vicksburg Map
 404	Jul/10/06		Alternative Service Certificates  /  Carolina Mystery Books  /  Mickey Mouse's Origin
 405	Jul/17/06		U.S.S. Indianapolis  /  Highlander Badge  /  Lindbergh Engine (R)
 406	Jul/24/06		Silent Film Reel  /  Chinese Opium Scale  /  Goering Gun (R)
 407	Jul/31/06		Survivor Camera  /  Mystery Crystal Cross  /  Alcoholics Anonymous Letter
 408	Aug/14/06		(repeats) Black Star Line  /  Doc Holliday's Watch  /. Calf Creek Arrow
 409	Aug/21/06		Grace Kelly Car  /  Harley-Davidson Motorcycle  /  Civil War POW Photos
 410	Aug/28/06		Lou Gehrig Autograph  /. Cleveland Electric Car  /  Philadelphia Freedom Paper
 411	Sep/04/06		Superman Sketch  /  Lost Musical Treasure  /  Rebel Whisky Flask
(Starting with season 5, PBS started offering the episodes on DVD)
 501	Jun/25/07		3D Cuban Missile Crisis  /  Amos 'n Andy Record  /  Women's Suffrage Painting
 502	Jul/02/07		Continental Currency  /  Short-Snorter  /  Liberty Bell Pin
 503	Jul/09/07		GAR Photograph  /  Jefferson Pledge  /  Dempsey Fight Bell
 504	Jul/16/07		Atocha Spanish Silver  /  Ernie Pyle's Typewriter  /  Lucy Parsons Book
 505	Jul/23/07		Great Mexican War Posters  /  Muhlenberg Robe  /  Nora Holt Autograph Book
 506	Jul/30/07		NC-4: First Across the Atlantic  /  Howard Hughes Crash  /  Civil War Balloon
 409r	Aug/06/07		(re-run of 409) Grace Kelly Car  /  Harley-Davidson Motorcycle  /  Civil War POW Photos
 403r	Aug/12/07		(re-run of 403) Coca-Cola Trade Card  /  Lawrence Strike  /  Vicksburg Map
 507	Aug/20/07		Red Cloud Letter  /  '32 Ford Roadster  /  Cast Iron Eagle
 508	Aug/27/07		Lincoln Letter  /  Quaker Map  /  U.S.S. Indianapolis (R)
 509	Sep/03/07		Bill Pickett Saddle  /  Hitler Films  /  McKinley Casket Flag (R)  (509)
 510	Sep/10/07		USS Thresher  /  Pete Gray Cartoon  /  Manhattan Project Letter.   (510)
 601	Jun/30/08	(still broadcast in re-runs) WWII Diary  /  Annie Oakley Coin  /  1856 Mormon Tale
 602	Jul/07/08		Red Hand Flag  /  Seth Eastman Painting  /  Isleton Tong
 603	Jul/14/08	(still broadcast in re-runs) Japanese Balloon Bomb  /  Society Circus Program  /  Camp David Letter
 604	Jul/21/08	(still broadcast in re-runs) China Marine Jacket  /  Airstream Caravan  /  Lincoln Forgery
 605	Jul/28/08		Hindenburg Artifact  /  Bonus Army Stamp  /  Dempsey Fight Bell (R)
 606	Aug/04/08		(repeats) GAR Photograph  /  Bill Pickett Saddle  /  Hitler Films
 607	Aug/11/08		Black Tom Shell  /  USS Olympia Glass  /  Front Street Blockhouse
 608	Aug/18/08		John Adams Book  /  Mankato Spoon  /  NC-4: First Across the Atlantic (R)
 609	Sep/08/08		Shipwreck Cannons  /  Connecticut Farmhouse  /  Kahlil Gibran Painting
 610	Sep/19/08		Blueprint Special  /  Monroe Letter  /  Atocha Spanish Silver (R)
 611	Feb/23/09		Slave Songbook  /  Josh White Guitar  /  Birthplace of Hip Hop
(As of 2011 the following seasons, 7 through S.I. are still being broadcast in re-runs)
 701	Jun/22/09		Psychophone  /  War Dog Letter  /  Pancho Villa Watch Fob
 702	Jun/29/09		Manhattan Project Patent  /  Galleon Shipwreck  /  Creole Poems
 703	Jul/06/09		St. Valentine's Day Massacre  /  Booth Letter  /  Cemetery Alarm
 704	Jul/13/09		Sideshow Babies  /  Lubin Photos  /  Navajo Rug
 705	Jul/20/09		Tokyo Rose  /  Crazy Horse  /  World War II Diary (R)
 706	Jul/27/09		Amelia Earhart Plane  /  Fillmore Pardon  /  Boxcar Home
 707	Aug/10/09		(repeats) Hindenburg Artifact  /  John Adams Book  /  Birthplace of Hip Hop
 708	Aug/17/09		Mussolini Dagger  /  Liberia Letter  /  N.E.A.R. Device
 709	Aug/24/09		WPA Mural Studies  /  George Washington Miniature  /  Japanese Balloon Bomb (R)
 710	Aug/31/09	    Stalag 17 Portrait  /  Seadrome  /  Black Tom Shell (R)
 711	Sep/07/09		Civil War Bridge  /  Scottsboro Boys Stamp  /  Duke Ellington Plates
 801	Jun/21/10		Space Exploration: Satelloon  /  Space Boot  /  Moon Museum
 802	Jun/28/10		Iwo Jima Map  /  Copperhead Cane  /  Theremin
 803	Jul/07/10		Lauste Film Clip  /  Baker's Gold  /  Transatlantic Cable
 804	Jul/12/10		Andrew Jackson's Mouth  /  Barton Letter  /  Spybook
 805	Jul/19/10		Cromwell Dixon  /  Bartlett Sketchbook  /  Duke Ellington Plates (R)
 806	Jul/26/10		Korean War Letter  /  Diana  /  Lookout Mt. Painting
 807	Aug/09/10		(repeats) St. Valentine's Day Massacre  /  Stalag 17  /  George Washington Miniature
 808	Aug/15/10		Hot Town Poster  /  Face Jug  /  Lost City of Gold
 809	Aug/23/10		Jackie Robinson All-Stars  /  Modoc Basket  /  Special Agent Five
 810	Aug/30/10		WB Cartoon  /  Galvez Papers  /  Mussolini Dagger (R)
 811	Sep/06/10		Chicago Clock  /  Universal Friends. /  War Dog Letter (R)
 901	Jun/21/11		Yakima Canutt's Saddle  /  The Ni'ihau Incident  /  Civil War Cannon
 902	Jun/26/11		Spanish Civil War Eulogy  /  World War II Leaflets  /  Tiffany Window
 903	Jul/05/11		Siberian Bullet  /  John Brown Pike  /  Ronald McDonald Costume
 904	Jul/12/11		African American Comic Book  /  Lindberg-Sikorsky Fabric  /  Civil War Letters
 905	Jul/19/11		Drone Propeller  /  Clara Barton Letter  /. Teddy Roosevelt War Club
 906	Jul/26/11		Kittery Telescope  /  Japanese Carved Cane  /  Baker's Gold (R)
 907	Aug/23/11		(repeats) Andrew Jackson's Mouth  /  Modoc Basket  /  Hot Town Poster
 908	Aug/30/11		Drug Smuggling Doll  /  Florida Map  /  Marion Carpenter Camera
 909	Sep/06/11		1775 Almanac  /  Exercise Records  /  Moon Museum (R)
 910	Sep/20/11	    Leopold Medal  /  Suffrage Pennant  /  WB Cartoons (R)
 911	Sep/27/11		Continental Club Card  /  Saint Valentine's Day Massacre  /  Society Circus Program (R)
 912	Oct/11/11		Chandler Tintype  /  Ince Ledger. /  Harlem Heirs
 1001	Jul/17/12		Bob Dylan Guitar  /  Beatles Autographs  /  Frank Zappa Collage
 1002	Jul/24/12		Civil War Derringers  /  Fiery Cross  /  Motown Amp
 1003	Jul/24/12		Rogue Book. /  Empire State Building Plane Crash Piece  /  Bettie Page Slide, Hollywood Sign
 1004	Jul/31/12		WWII Patch/ Lincoln Oath  /  Chief Black Kettle  /  Marshall House Flag
 1005	Aug/01/12		Luxury Liner Picture Frame  /  Woolworth Sign  /  Nazi Spy Toys
 1006	Oct/02/12		Vietnamese Soldier's Diary  /  Bootlegger's Notebook  /  Hollywood Indian Ledger
 1007	Oct/08/12		WWI Poster/ Valley Forge Map  /  Transistor Radio  /  70-Year-Old Business Card
 1009	Jan/08/13		Negro Girl 'Bill of Sale' / Revolutionary War Powder Horn / Star Spangled Banner / 1775 Almanac
 1008	Apr/02/12		Kit Carson Family Secrets. /  Yakima Canutt's Saddle(R). /. Inscription on Sheet Music for 'Tumbling Tumbleweeds'  /  Modoc Basket
 1101	2014		Special Investigations 1. Civil War Sabotage?
 1102	2014		Special Investigations 2. The Disappearance of Glenn Miller
 1103	2014		Special Investigations 3. Texas Servant Girl Murders
 1104	2014		Special Investigations 4. Who Killed Jimmy Hoffa?

History Detectives Story Airings: 1st 2nd & 3rd.
(DVD) means PBS released the story on DVD, seasons 5 through 10 & Special Investigations

 1775 Almanac (DVD)	909	1008	
 1856 Mormon Tale	(DVD) 601		
 32 Ford Roadster	(DVD) 507		
 3D Cuban Missile Crisis (DVD)	501		
 70-Year-Old Business Card (DVD)	1007		
 African American Comic Book (DVD)	904		
 Airstream Caravan	(DVD) 604		
 Alcoholics Anonymous Letter	407		
 Alternative Service Certificates	404		
 Amelia Earhart Plane	(DVD) 706		
 Amos 'n Andy Record (DVD)	(DVD) 501		
 Andrew Jackson's Mouth (DVD)	804	907	
 Annie Oakley Coin	(DVD) 601		
 Anti-Slavery Flag	203		
 Arthur Szyk's Earliest Cartoons	303		
 Atocha Spanish Silver	(DVD) 504	610	
 Baker's Gold (DVD)	803	906	
 Ballet Shoes	309		
 Banned Birth Control Box	306		
 Bartlett Sketchbook	(DVD) 805		
 Barton Letter	(DVD) 804		
 Beatles Autographs (DVD)	1001		
 Bettie Page Slide (DVD)	1003		
 Bill Pickett Saddle (DVD)	509	606	
 Birthplace of Hip Hop	(DVD) 611	707	
 Black Star Line	 302	408	
 Black Tom Shell	(DVD) 607	710	
 Blueprint Special	(DVD) 610		
 Boarding House Flag	108		
 Bob Dylan Guitar (DVD)	1001		
 Body in the Basement	212		
 Bonnie & Clyde Bullets	102	208	
 Bonus Army Stamp	(DVD) 605		
 Booth Letter	(DVD) 703		
 Bootlegger's Notebook (DVD)	1006		
 Boxcar Home	(DVD) 706		
 Calf Creek Arrow	308	408	
 Camp David Letter	(DVD) 603		
 Cannon House	104		
 Carolina Mystery Books	404		
 Cast Iron Eagle	509		
 Cemetery Alarm  (DVD)	703		
 Cesar Chavez Banner	209		
 Chandler Tintype (DVD)	912		
 Charlie Parker's Saxophone	211		
 Chemical Warfare Map	303		
 Cherokee Bible	304		
 Chicago Clock	(DVD) 811		
 Chief Black Kettle (DVD)	1004		
 China Marine Jacket	(DVD) 604		
 Chinese Opium Scale	406		
 Chinese Poems	106	207	
 Chisholm Trail, The	401		
 Civil War Balloon	(DVD) 506		
 Civil War Bridge	(DVD) 711		
 Civil War Cannon (DVD)	901		
 Civil War Derringers (DVD)	1002		
 Civil War Female Soldiers	307		
 Civil War Letters (DVD)	904		
 Civil War POW Photos	(DVD) 409	507	
 Civil War Submarine	201		
 Clara Barton Letter (DVD)	905		
 Cleveland Electric Car	410		
 Coca-Cola Trade Card	(DVD) 403	508	
 Coney Island Lion	309		
 Confederate Eyeglass	402		
 Connecticut Farmhouse	(DVD) 609		
 Continental Army Muster Roll	210		
 Continental Club Card (DVD)	911		
 Continental Currency	(DVD) 502		
 Copperhead Cane	(DVD) 802		
 Crazy Horse	(DVD) 705		
 Creole Poems	(DVD) 702		
 Cromwell Dixon  (DVD)	805		
 Dempsey Fight Bell  (DVD)	503	605	
 Diana	(DVD) 806		
 Doc Holliday's Watch	307	408	
 Drone Propeller (DVD)	905		
 Drug Smuggling Doll (DVD)	908		
 Dueling Pistols	205		
 Duke Ellington Plates	(DVD) 711	805	
 Dutch Colonial Home	109		
 Early Monopoly	202		
 Empire State Building Plane Crash Piece (DVD)	1003		
 Ernie Pyle's Typewriter (DVD)	504		
 Evelyn Nesbit Portrait	311		
 Exercise Records (DVD)	909		
 Face Jug	(DVD) 808		
 Fiery Cross (DVD)	1002		
 Fillmore Pardon (DVD)	706		
 First Movie Studio	204		
 Flint-Lock Rifle	110		
 Florida Map (DVD)	908		
 Frank Zappa Collage (DVD)	1001		
 Front Street Blockhouse (DVD)	607		
 Galleon Shipwreck	(DVD 702		
 Galvez Papers	(DVD) 810		
 GAR Photograph  (DVD)	503	606	
 General Lee Farewell	105		
 General Washington Portrait	104	208	305
 George Washington Miniature (DVD)	709	807	
 Geronimo Photograph	301		
 Goering Gun	308	406	
 Grace Kelly Car (DVD)	409	507	
 Great Mexican War Posters	(DVD) 505		
 Harlem Heirs (DVD)	912		
 Harley-Davidson Motorcycle  (DVD)	409	507	
 Harry Houdini Poster	401		
 Highlander Badge	405		
 Hindenburg Artifact (DVD)	605	707	
 Hitler Films (DVD)	509	606	
 Hollywood Indian Ledger (DVD)	1006		
 Hollywood Sign (DVD)	1003		
 Hollywood: Warner's Lighter	204		
 Home for Unwed Mothers	311		
 Home of Lincoln Assassination Plot	108	206	
 Hot Town Poster (DVD)	808	907	
 Howard Hughes Crash  (DVD)	506		
 Howard Hughes' Invention	402		
 Ince Ledger (DVD)	912		
 Independence Trumpet	104		
 Inscription on Sheet Music for 'Tumbling Tumbleweeds' (DVD)	1008		
 Internment Artwork	202		
 Isleton Tong	(DVD) 602		
 Iwo Jima Map	(DVD) 802		
 Jackie Robinson All-Stars	(DVD) 809		
 Japanese Balloon Bomb	603	709	
 Japanese Carved Cane (DVD)  906		
 Japanese House	106		
 Japanese Internment Camp Artwork	307		
 Jefferson Pledge (DVD) 503		
 Jigsaw Puzzle	103		
 Jim Thorpe Ticket	310		
 John Adams Book  (DVD)	608	707	
 John Brown Pike (DVD)	903		
 John Browns Letters	106		
 John Hunt Morgan Saddle	209		
 Josh White Guitar	(DVD) 611		
 Kahlil Gibran Painting  (DVD)	609		
 King Kong Camera	204		
 Kit Carson Family Secrets (DVD)	1008		
 Kittery Telescope (DVD)	906		
 Koranic School Book	211		
 Korean War Letter	(DVD) 806		
 Lafayette China	110		
 Land Grant	310		
 Lauste Film Clip	(DVD) 803		
 Lawrence Strike  (DVD)  403	508	
 Legacy of a Doll	309		
 Leisurama Homes	310		
 Leopold Medal (DVD)	910		
 Lewis and Clark Cane	202		
 Liberia Letter  (DVD)	708		
 Liberty Bell Pin	(DVD) 502		
 Lincoln Forgery  (DVD)	604		
 Lincoln Letter  (DVD)	510		
 Lincoln Oath (DVD)  1004		
 Lindberg-Sikorsky Fabric (DVD)  904		
 Lindbergh Engine	301	405	
 Little Big Horn Bayonet	205		
 Long Expedition Encampment	311		
 Lookout Mt. Painting	(DVD)  806		
 Lost City of Gold	(DVD)  808		
 Lost Gold Ship	209		
 Lost Musical Treasure	411		
 Lou Gehrig Autograph	410		
 Lubin Photos	(DVD) 704		
 Lucy Parsons Book	(DVD) 504		
 Luxury Liner Picture Frame (DVD)	1005		
 Mail Order Brides	203		
 Manhattan Project Letter (DVD) 510		
 Manhattan Project Patent	(DVD) 702		
 Mankato Spoon	(DVD) 608		
 Marion Carpenter Camera (DVD)	908		
 Mark Twain's Watch	109		
 Marshall House Flag (DVD)	1004		
 McKinley Casket Flag (DVD)  401	509	
 Mexican Currency	107		
 Mickey Mouse's Origin	404		
 Micky Mouse	302		
 Modoc Basket (DVD)  809	907	1008
 Monroe Letter	(DVD)  610		
 Moon Museum (DVD)	909		
 Motown Amp (DVD)	1002		
 Mountain Mail Bag	306		
 Movie Palace	102		
 Muhlenberg Robe  (DVD)  505		
 Mussolini Dagger	(DVD)  708	810	
 Mystery Crystal Cross	407		
 N.E.A.R. Device (DVD)	708		
 Napoleons Sword	105		
 Natchez House	105		
 Navajo Rug  (DVD)	704		
 Nazi Spy Toys (DVD)	1005		
 NC-4: First Across the Atlantic	(DVD)  506	608	
 Negro Girl 'Bill of Sale' (DVD)	1009		
 Nesbit Portrait	205		
 Newport U-Boat	212		
 Ni'ihau Incident, The (DVD)	901		
 Nora Holt Autograph Book	(DVD)  505		
 Old Fire Station	101		
 Pancho Villa Watch Fob  (DVD)	701		
 Pebble in the Sand	101		
 Pete Gray Cartoon	(DVD as #510) 512		
 Philadelphia Freedom Paper	410		
 Pirate Spyglass	107		
 Pop' Lloyd Baseball Stadium	101	210	
 Preston Brooks' Riding Crop	206		
 Pretty Boy Floyd's Gun	210		
 Prison Plaque	110	211	
 Professor Lowe's Hot Air Balloon	303		
 Psychophone (DVD) 701		
 Quaker Map  (DVD)	510		
 Railroad Station	107		
 Rebel Whisky Flask	411		
 Red Cloud Letter	(DVD) 509		
 Red Cloud's Peace Pipe	201		
 Red Hand Flag	(DVD) 602		
 Revolutionary War Cannon	206	305	
 Revolutionary War Poem	109	208	305
 Revolutionary War Powder Horn (DVD)	1009		
 Rogue Book (DVD)	1003
 Ronald McDonald Costume (DVD)	903		
 Saint Valentine's Day Massacre (DVD)	911		
 Scottsboro Boys Stamp	(DVD) 711		
 Seadrome	(DVD) 710		
 Sears Home	102		
 Secrets of the Tape	306		
 Seth Eastman Painting	(DVD) 602		
 Shippen Golf Club	212		
 Shipwreck Cannons	(DVD) 609		
 Short-Snorter	(DVD) 502		
 Siberian Bullet (DVD)	903		
 Sideshow Babies  (DVD) 704		
 Silent Film Reel	406		
 Slave Banjo	304		
 Slave Songbook  (DVD)	611		
 Society Circus Program (DVD)	603	911	
 Space Exploration	(DVD) 801		
 Spanish Civil War Eulogy (DVD)	902		
 Special Agent Five (DVD) 809		
 Spybook  (DVD) 804		
 St. Valentine's Day Massacre	(DVD)  703	807	
 Stalag 17 Portrait  (DVD)	710	807	
 Star Spangled Banner (DVD)  1009		
 Suffrage Pennant (DVD)  910		
 Suicide Pin	301		
 Superman Sketch	411		
 Survivor Camera	407		
 Teddy Roosevelt War Club (DVD)	905		
 Texas POW Camp	302		
 Theremin (DVD)  802		
 Thomas Edison's House	201	308	
 Tiffany Window (DVD)	902		
 Tokyo Rose (DVD) 705		
 Transatlantic Cable (DVD)	803		
 Transistor Radio (DVD) 1007		
 U.S.S. Indianapolis (DVD)	405	510	
 United Empire Loyalist 304		
 Universal Friends	(DVD) 811		
 USS Olympia Glass	(DVD) 607		
 USS Thresher (DVD) 510		
 Valley Forge Map (DVD) 1007		
 Ventriloquist's Dummy	108	207	
 Vicksburg Map	(DVD)  403	508	
 Vietnamese Soldier's Diary (DVD)	1006		
 War Dog Letter (DVD) 701	811	
 Wartime Baseball	402		
 WB Cartoon  (DVD)	810	910	
 Whaling Ship	103		
 Witch's House	103	207	
 Women's Suffrage Painting (DVD) 501		
 Woolworth Sign (DVD)	1005		
 World War II Leaflets (DVD)	902		
 WPA Mural Studies	(DVD) 709		
 WWI Poster (DVD)	1007		
 WWII Diary  (DVD)	601	705	
 WWII Landing Craft	203		
 WWII Patch (DVD)	1004		
 Yakima Canutt's Saddle (DVD)	901	1008	
 Special Investigations 1. Civil War Sabotage?  (DVD)			
 Special Investigations 2. The Disappearance of Glenn Miller	(DVD)		
 Special Investigations 3. Texas Servant Girl Murders	(DVD)		
 Special Investigations 4. Who Killed Jimmy Hoffa?	(DVD)

See also
 American Treasures, similar show on Discovery

References
 https://www.pbs.org/show/history-detectives/episodes/season/10/

Further reading 
 Kiesewetter, John (2003) "Appraiser Cowan to co-host new antiques show on PBS", Cincinnati Enquirer, July 14, 2003, p. C2. Cowan explains the relationship of the on-air researchers to the actual research.

External links
 

2003 American television series debuts
2014 American television series endings
2000s American documentary television series
2010s American documentary television series
PBS original programming
Social history of the United States